Thairiyam is a 2010 Indian Tamil-language action film written and directed by P. Kumaran. Produced by RP Creations, the film stars the director himself and Deepu, with Karthika also playing a role. The film was released on 29 January 2010.

Plot 
Kumaran saves his girlfriend, Deepu from the menacing Riyaz Khan. Following a duel with Kumaran, Riyaz slips into a coma but the intrigue lies in the fact that all Riyaz' friends are killed. Several twists and turns involving the evil-minded villain Kamaraj form the crux of the film.

Cast 
 P. Kumaran
 Deepu as Ramya
 Karthika as Jennifer
 Radha Ravi
 Ponnamabalam
 Devan
 Riyaz Khan
 Rekha
 Pragathi
 Aarthi
 Ajay Rathnam
 Manobala
 Saravana Subbiah
 Vasu Vikram
 Pandiarajan as Guest appearance

Production 
The film went through a silent change of director prior to release with the original director M. Sarojkumar being replaced by the lead, Kumaran as the film was in development. Furthermore, in September 2009, a stunt sequence towards the climax was shot for over 15 days and involved hundreds of extras.

Release

Reception 
The film opened in a few centres across Chennai, Tamil Nadu to a below average opening. The film which grossed Rs. 3,46,944 in the opening weekend in Chennai became a commercial failure at the box-office.

Reviews 
Upon release, the film fetched average reviews with The Hindu claiming it was an "okay first attempt".  In regard of the performances it claimed that Kumaran "passes the litmus test. Nevertheless, he must take care of his make-up". Whilst actresses Deepu as Ramya is "average" but manages to get more frames than the heroine. Karthika as Jennifer is said to "look good but has nothing much to do but stand beside the hero". Whilst in regard to the production it cites that Kumaran, who multi-tasks — writing the story, screenplay, dialogue, acting, directing and producing — "seems to lose concentration here and there".

Soundtrack 

Film score and the soundtrack are composed by newcomer R. D. Mohan Singh. The film featured songs from notable singers such as Harish Raghavendra, Tippu and Deva.

References

External links 
 

2010 films
2010s Tamil-language films